Prince Ivan Yurievich Trubetskoy (28 June 1667 – 27 January 1750 in Aleksandr Nevsky Monastery) was a Russian Field Marshal, promoted in 1728. Son of Yuriy Trubetskoy, as a member of the House of Trubetskoy, he was a member of the inner circle of Tsar Peter I of Russia of the House of Romanov. Made a boyar in 1692, Trubetskoy commanded part of the Russian fleet during the Azov campaigns in 1696. In 1699, he was named governor of Novgorod. Trubetskoy ordered surrender during the Battle of Narva in 1700. He was captured and held prisoner in Sweden until exchanged in 1718. At the moment of death he remain the last living boyar in Russia.
Elisabeth made him member of the renewed Senate.

References

Ivan Bolshoy
Russian nobility
1667 births
1750 deaths
Governors-General of Moscow
Field marshals of Russia
17th-century Russian military personnel
18th-century military personnel from the Russian Empire
Russian military personnel of the Great Northern War
Burials at Lazarevskoe Cemetery (Saint Petersburg)